Clifford Meth is an American writer, editor, and publisher best known for his dark fiction, as well as his publishing imprint Aardwolf Publishing. He has said that his work is often "self-consciously Jewish."

Early life
Meth grew up in Rockaway, New Jersey and attended Morris Hills High School. He attended Rutgers University and Fairleigh Dickinson University in the United States, and Wroxton College in the United Kingdom.

Meth was associated with the Chabad-Lubavitch religious movement in the 1980s, but moved away from the movement following the death of the Lubavitcher Rebbe in 1994.

Career

In publishing 
In the early 1980s, Meth worked as a staff editor for Electronic Design while freelancing for the Los Angeles Times Entertainment Newswire, Fangoria, Starlog, Billboard and other periodicals.

One of Meth's first published fictional works was "I, Gezheh", which dealt with abuse. Author Robert Bloch provided an afterword for the story, which was illustrated by Dave Cockrum.

With the aid of Cockrum and fantasy artist Gray Morrow, Meth co-founded Aardwolf Publishing, along with business partner Jim Reeber in 1994. The company has published a series of comic books, art portfolios, and collections of illustrated fiction.

In 2004, Meth joined IDT Entertainment's Creative Development team. and worked on Showtime's Masters of Horror series and ABC's Masters of Science Fiction. In 2004, he was story editor for Gene Roddenberry's Starpoint Academy, an animated feature screenplay IDT hired Peter David to script. Meth left IDT Entertainment in 2006 when the division was sold to Liberty Media. In 2007 he oversaw the acquisition of IDW Publishing by IDT Corporation and joined IDW as executive vice president, editorial/strategies. The following year, producer Richard Saperstein optioned film rights to Meth's IDW horror comic-book series, Snaked, with Meth as screenwriter and an executive producer.

In 2008, Meth launched IDW Publishing's "New Classics of the Fantastic Series", which published out-of-print Hugo and Nebula Award-winning books, beginning with Robert Silverberg's Nightwings.

Charitable work
In 2008, Meth established the Dave & Paty Cockrum Scholarship at the Joe Kubert School of Cartoon and Graphic Art. In 2010, Meth founded the Kars4Kids Literacy Program, which has made significant contributions to such universities as Seton Hall University.

On numerous occasions Meth has spearheaded campaigns to raise money and awareness for financially challenged comics’ creators, including Gene Colan, William Messner-Loebs and Dave Simons.

Bibliography

Publications
 girl (chapbook) (Fairleigh Dickinson University Press, 1983)
 Snaked (with Rufus Dayglo, IDW Publishing, 2007)
 One Small Voice (IDW Publishing, 2008)
 Billboards (IDW Publishing, 2009)
 Dave Cockrum's X-Men Artifact Edition (Marvel Entertainment/IDW Publishing, 2020) (Afterword)

Aardwolf Publishing 
 Crib Death & Other Bedtime Stories (Aardwolf Publishing, 1995)
 This Bastard Planet: Another Crib Death (Aardwolf Publishing, 1995)
 The White Man Dancing (Aardwolf Publishing, 1996)
 Crawling From the Wreckage: The White Man Limping (Aardwolf Publishing, 1996)
 Crib Death: The Babysitter's Companion (Aardwolf Publishing, 1997)
 Perverts, Pedophiles & Other Theologians (Aardwolf Publishing, 1997)
 Conflicts of Disinterest (Aardwolf Publishing, 1998)
 Wearing The Horns (Aardwolf Publishing, 2003)
 god's 15 minutes (Aardwolf Publishing, 2004)
 METHo.d. (Aardwolf Publishing, 2006)
 Meth, Colan & Other Theologians (Aardwolf Publishing, 2008)
 Comic Book Babylon (Aardwolf Publishing, 2013)
 Dave Cockrum's Futurians Return' (Aardwolf Publishing, 2014)

As editor
 Strange Kaddish (Aardwolf Publishing, 1996)
 Stranger Kaddish (Aardwolf Publishing, 1997)
 Heroes and Villains (with Neal Adams), (TwoMorrows Publishing, 2005)
 Balm in Gilead (Mahrwood Press, 2007)
 The Uncanny Dave Cockrum (Aardwolf Publishing, 2007)
 Nightwings by Robert Silverberg (IDW Publishing, New Classics of the Fantastic, 2008)
 Hothouse by Brian Aldiss (IDW Publishing, New Classics of the Fantastic, 2009)
 Dare by Philip Jose Farmer (IDW Publishing, New Classics of the Fantastic, 2009)
 Rogue Dragon by Avram Davidson (IDW Publishing, New Classics of the Fantastic, 2009)
 Lori by Robert Bloch (IDW Publishing, New Classics of the Fantastic, 2009)
 The Invincible Gene Colan (Marvel Entertainment, 2010)
 Rich Buckler: Artist, Innovator (Aardwolf Publishing, 2016)

Audio
In 2008, the album Caged'' by Septimus Orion included a recording of Meth's short story "Queers", accompanied by music and sound effects.

Awards and recognition
August 2014 Inkwell Awards Special Ambassador (August 2014 – present)

Notes

External links

Living people
1961 births
Comics critics
Jewish American writers
Fairleigh Dickinson University alumni
People from Rockaway, New Jersey
Rutgers University alumni
21st-century American Jews